The Sierra Foothills AVA (established in 1987) is an American Viticultural Area in the foothills of the Sierra Nevada in the U.S. state of California in the United States. Wine grapes were introduced to the area in the nineteenth century during the California Gold Rush. Over 100 wineries are located within its boundaries.

Geography and climate
The Sierra Foothills AVA contains portions of eight California counties: Amador, Calaveras, El Dorado, Mariposa, Nevada, Placer, Tuolumne and Yuba.

History
Wine grapes were first planted in the foothills of the Sierra Nevada during the California Gold Rush of the late 1840s and early 1850s. Federal recognition of the viticultural area occurred on November 18, 1987.

Vineyards
 of the appellation are planted to grapevines. Other grape varieties are grown in smaller quantities.

There are over 100 wineries located within the Sierra Foothills AVA.  Many are small, boutique wineries, often family-owned. The first known planting in the Sierra Foothills was in the Coarsegold Gulch area during the Gold Rush period.

See also 
California wine

Wikipedia articles about wineries in the Sierra Foothills AVA 

Bear River Winery
Lone Buffalo Winery
Ironstone Vineyards
Le Casque Winery

References

American Viticultural Areas of California
American Viticultural Areas
Sierra Nevada (United States)
Geography of Amador County, California
Geography of Calaveras County, California
Geography of El Dorado County, California
Geography of Mariposa County, California
Geography of Nevada County, California
Geography of Yuba County, California
1987 establishments in California